Roosevelt Henry Owens (born December 22, 1910 - death date unknown) was an American baseball pitcher in the Negro leagues. He played with Newark Dodgers/Eagles in 1934 and 1937, the Baltimore Black Sox in 1934, and the Brooklyn Royal Giants in 1937.

References

External links
 and Seamheads

Baltimore Black Sox players
Brooklyn Royal Giants players
Newark Dodgers players
Newark Eagles players
1910 births
Year of death unknown
Baseball players from Georgia (U.S. state)
Baseball pitchers